Trincavelli is an Italian surname. Notable people with the surname include:

Franco Trincavelli (1935–1983), Italian rower 
Vittore Trincavelli (1496–1568), Italian physician, editor, and scholar

Italian-language surnames